Murphy Inlet is an ice-filled inlet about 18 nautical miles (33 km) long, with two parallel branches at the head, lying between Noville and Edwards Peninsulas on the north side of Thurston Island, Antarctica. It was delineated from aerial photographs taken by U.S. Navy Operation HIGHJUMP in December 1946. It was named by the Advisory Committee on Antarctic Names for Charles J. V. Murphy, assistant to Richard E. Byrd after the Byrd Antarctic Expedition of 1928–30, and member of the wintering party of the Byrd Antarctic Expedition of 1933–35.

Maps 
 Thurston Island – Jones Mountains. 1:500000 Antarctica Sketch Map. US Geological Survey, 1967.
 Antarctic Digital Database (ADD). Scale 1:250000 topographic map of Antarctica. Scientific Committee on Antarctic Research (SCAR), 1993–2016.

Further reading 
 United States. Defense Mapping Agency. Hydrographic Center, Sailing Directions for Antarctica: Includes Islands South of Latitude 60°, P 210

External links 

 Murphy Inlet on USGS website
 Murphy Inlet on AADC website
 Murphy Inlet on SCAR website
 Murphy Inlet on marineregions.org

References 

Inlets of Ellsworth Land
Thurston Island